The 38th Deauville American Film Festival took place at Deauville, France from August 31 to September 9, 2012. Jeff Nichols's drama film Mud served as the opening night film. Savages by Oliver Stone was the closing night film of the festival. The Grand Prix was awarded to Beasts of the Southern Wild by Benh Zeitlin.

Complete lineup for the festival was announced on July 25, 2012, including episodes from Television shows for the Television section at the festival. Fashion designer and filmmaker Agnès B. was given Carte blanche section to show seven of her favourite American films to the festival audience. The festival paid tribute to William Friedkin, Salma Hayek, Harvey Keitel, Liam Neeson, Melvin Van Peebles, Paula Wagner and John Williams and hosted retrospective of their films. Paul Dano received Le Nouvel Hollywood (Hollywood Rising Star) award.

Juries

Main Competition
Sandrine Bonnaire: French actress, film director and screenwriter (President of Jury) 
Clotilde Courau: French actress and Princess of Venice and Piedmont
Sami Bouajila: French-Tunisian actor
Christophe Honoré: French writer and film director
Anaïs Demoustier: French actress
Alice Taglioni: French actress
Philippe Decouflé: French choreographer, dancer, mime artist, and theatre director
Joann Sfar: French comics artist, comic book creator, novelist, and film director
Florent Emilio Siri: French video game and film director and screenwriter

Cartier revelation jury
Frédéric Beigbeder: French writer, literary critic and a TV presenter (President of Jury) 
Àstrid Bergès-Frisbey: French-Spanish actress and model
Mélanie Bernier: French actress
Ana Girardot: French actress
Félix Moati: French actor

Programme

Competition
Beasts of the Southern Wild by Benh Zeitlin
Booster by Matt Ruskin
California Solo by Marshall Lewy
Compliance by Craig Zobel
Electrick Children by Rebecca Thomas
For Ellen by So Yong Kim
Francine by Melanie Shatzky and Brian M. Cassidy
Gimme the Loot by Adam Leon
God Bless America by Bobcat Goldthwait
Robot & Frank by Jake Schreier
Smashed by James Ponsoldt
The We and the I by Michel Gondry
Una Noche by Lucy Mulloy
Wrong by Quentin Dupieux
Your Sister's Sister by Lynn Shelton

Les Premières (Premieres)
Bachelorette by Leslye Headland
Blackbird by Jason Buxton
Killer Joe by William Friedkin
Lawless by Mark Steven Johnson
Ruby Sparks by Jonathan Dayton and Valerie Faris
Savages by Oliver Stone
Secret of the Wings by Peggy Holmes and Roberts Gannaway
Take This Waltz by Sarah Polley
Taken 2 by Olivier Megaton
Ted by Seth MacFarlane
The Bourne Legacy by Tony Gilroy
The Tall Man by Pascal Laugier

Les Docs De L'Oncle Sam (Uncle Sam's Doc)
Diana Vreeland: The Eye Has to Travel by Lisa Immordino Vreeland, Frédéric Tcheng and Bent-Jorgen Perlmutt
Ethel by Rory Kennedy
Tomi Ungerer - l'esprit frappeur by Brad Bernstein
Gazzara by Joseph Rezwin
Into the Abyss by Werner Herzog
Method to the Madness of Jerry Lewis by Gregg Barson
Room 237 by Rodney Ascher
Searching for Sugar Man by Malik Bendjelloul
The Imposter by Bart Layton
The Queen of Versailles by Lauren Greenfield
West of Memphis by Amy J. Berg

La Nuit américaine (American cinema overview)
Bad Lieutenant by Abel Ferrara
Bandidas by Joachim Rønning
Bug by William Friedkin
Cinq cent balles by Melvin Van Peebles
Cruising by William Friedkin
Desperado by Robert Rodriguez
La Fête à Harlem by Melvin Van Peebles
Lonely Hearts by Todd Robinson
Love Actually by Richard Curtis
Mean Streets by Martin Scorsese
Michael Collins by Neil Jordan
Mission: Impossible by Brian De Palma
Schindler's List by Steven Spielberg
Sweet Sweetback's Baadasssss Song by Melvin Van Peebles
The Exorcist by William Friedkin
The French Connection by William Friedkin
The Last Samurai by Edward Zwick
To Live and Die in LA by William Friedkin
Vanilla Sky by Cameron Crowe
War of the Worlds by Steven Spielberg

Carte blanche
Freaks by Tod Browning
Lost Highway by David Lynch
Reflections in a Golden Eye by John Huston
Reservoir Dogs by Quentin Tarantino
Seven Chances by Buster Keaton
The Big Shave by Martin Scorsese
Trash Humpers by Harmony Korine

Séance culte
Westworld by Michael Crichton

Television
Girls by Lena Dunham
Homeland by Howard Gordon and Alex Gansa
The Newsroom by Aaron Sorkin
Shameless by Paul Abbott

Awards

The festival awarded the following awards:
Grand Prix (Grand Special Prize): Beasts of the Southern Wild by Benh Zeitlin
Prix du Jury (Jury Special Prize): Una Noche by Lucy Mulloy
Prix de la Critique Internationale (International Critics' prize): The We and the I by Michel Gondry
Prix Michel d'Ornano (Michel d'Ornano Award for debut French film): Hold Back by Rachid Djaïdani
Prix de la Révélation Cartier (Cartier Revelation Prize): Beasts of the Southern Wild by Benh Zeitlin
Lucien Barrière Prize for Literature:
I Am Not Sidney Poitier by Percival Everett
Tributes:
William Friedkin
Salma Hayek
Harvey Keitel
Liam Neeson
Melvin Van Peebles
Paula Wagner
John Williams
Le Nouvel Hollywood (Hollywood Rising Star):
Paul Dano

References

External links

 Official site
 2012 Official Press Kit
 Deauville American Film Festival:2012 at Internet Movie Database

2012 in French cinema
2012 film festivals
2012 festivals in Europe
21st century in France
Film festivals in France